The 1995 Belgian Procar Championshipwas won by Thierry Tassin driving a BMW 318iS for the BMW Fina Bastos Team. The manufacture trophy was won by BMW.

Teams and drivers

Race calendar and results

Championship standings
Scoring system

Championship results

Manufacturers' Trophy

Sources
 Touring Car World 95/96 — The official book of Touring car

External links

Belgian Procar Championship
Motorsport in Belgium
1995 in motorsport
1995 in Belgian motorsport